Weird Lake is a natural lake in Cook County, Minnesota, United States.

See also
List of lakes in Minnesota

References

Lakes of Minnesota
Lakes of Cook County, Minnesota